Dysnomia can refer to the following:

 Anomic aphasia, also known as Dysnomia, a condition affecting memory
 Dysnomia, an album by Dawn of Midi
 Dysnomia (deity), "Lawlessness" - a child of the mythological Greek goddess Eris
 Dysnomia (genus), a genus of freshwater mussels now known as Epioblasma
 Dysnomia (moon), a moon of the dwarf planet Eris

See also 
 Dyssomnia